Dark & Wild (stylized DARK&WILD) is the debut studio album of South Korean boy group BTS. It was released by Big Hit Entertainment on August 20, 2014. The album contains fourteen tracks, with "Danger" as its lead single. The third track on the album, "War of Hormone", was later promoted as a secondary single.

Background and release
On July 30, 2014, Big Hit Entertainment launched a countdown clock on BTS' official website, and on August 5, they uploaded a comeback trailer on YouTube which featured contrasting scenes. One scene from the trailer featured a forest paradise, while another showed black and white abandoned structures accompanied with lyrics from a Rap Monster verse. On August 7, 2014, the company released the first teaser photos and the concept photo for the new album. BTS also released a B-Side Song titled “Let Me Know” for free streaming, which was composed and produced by Suga. The company later released the album's tracklist on the group's official Facebook and Twitter pages. It confirmed that there were 14 tracks, with "Danger" circled in red, indicating that it was the title song. Big Hit Entertainment later released two music video teasers for the lead single "Danger". BTS also later released an audio preview of their album on the group's SoundCloud page which featured short excerpts from the tracks that made up the album with harder hip-hop tracks, R&B sounds and electronica elements interspersed. On October 21, BTS released 19 concept photos of the follow-up song "War of Hormone" through their official Facebook page and Twitter account. The teaser for the remix of "Danger" was then released on November 13, as a result of collaboration with a Vietnamese singer, Thanh Bùi.

During production of the album, BTS recorded their single "Danger" in a makeshift studio in a garage in Los Angeles.

Music videos
On August 19, 2014, the music video for "Danger" was released on 1theK's YouTube Channel. It featured the group dressed in black performing with sharp choreography in a subway tunnel, and in a warehouse with burning shopping carts. 

The music video for "War of Hormone" was published on YouTube on October 21, ahead of BTS' follow-up promotions. The music video showed the boys dressed in retro outfits and dancing at an outdoor set. Zanybros produced the "War of Hormone" music video. 

For both "Danger" and "War of Hormone," the band danced to choreography that was created by Son Sungdeuk. One month later, the remixed version of the "Danger" music video, a collaboration with a Vietnamese singer and songwriter Thanh Bùi, was released. The "Danger" music video was produced and directed by Lumpens and GDW.

Composition
The album served as a narrative extension of the "school trilogy" and a transition into their next series. Musically, the album fused the grungy electric guitar sounds of rock within the framework of hip-hop and continued to expand their sound towards R&B. The central theme of the album's lyrics focused on expressing the sentiments of maturing, youthful desires, and impatience for romance.

Promotions
BTS held a press conference and comeback showcase on August 19, 2014, performing "Danger", "War of Hormone", and "Let Me Know". The group later continued with their promotion of the album on various South Korean music programs starting on August 21, while performing the lead single "Danger". The follow-up promotion of the album with "War of Hormone" on October 23 started right after the release of its music video on YouTube, during their concert tour. On October 17, the group held the first half of BTS Live Trilogy Episode II: The Red Bullet concert tour for the promotion of the album at AX-Korea as the first venue and ended on December 20 in Bangkok.

Some listeners responded to the song "War of Hormone" by saying it was misogynist. The band's agency then released an apology about the song, stating that the members felt remorse for anything that could've been interpreted as objectification or misogyny.

Commercial performance
Dark & Wild debuted at number two in South Korea on the Gaon Gaon Weekly Album Chart issue for the third week of August 2014. It went on to sell 51,655 copies by the end of that month and peaked at number three on the Gaon Monthly Chart for August. According to Gaon's year-end album chart for 2014, Dark&Wild was the 14th best-selling album of the year, having sold 100,906 cumulative copies.

The album also entered various Billboard charts in the United States, ranking at numbers 3 and 27 on the World Albums and Top Heatseekers charts respectively. This marked the second time that a BTS release charted on Billboards album rankings. Both of the album's singles entered the World Digital Songs chart: "Danger" peaked at number 7 on the issue dated September 6, while "War of Hormone" peaked at number 11 on the issue dated November 8. The album went on to spend  11 non-consecutive weeks on the World ranking. 

Dark&Wild won a Bonsang in the Album Division at the 29th Golden Disc Awards in January 2015.

Track listing
All song credits are adapted from the Korea Music Copyright Association's database, unless otherwise noted.

Charts

Weekly charts

Monthly charts

Yearly charts

Sales and certifications

Release history

See also
 List of K-pop songs on the Billboard charts
 List of K-pop albums on the Billboard charts
 Golden Disk Awards

References

2014 debut albums
BTS albums
Korean-language albums
Kakao M albums
Hybe Corporation albums